Thomas James Smith (born 2 December 1999) is an English rugby union back row for Doncaster Knights in the RFU Championship, the second division.  He previously played for Leicester Tigers in Premiership Rugby.

Career
Smith made his debut for Leicester Tigers on 27 October 2018 in a Premiership Rugby Cup defeat against Saracens, two years later on 15 August 2020 Smith made his full Premiership debut from the bench against Exeter Chiefs.

Two weeks later Smith became Leicester's youngest captain in a league game when he led the side on 30 August 2020 against Gloucester.

On 3 December 2021 Smith was released by Leicester to join Doncaster Knights in the RFU Championship for the 2021-22 season.

References

1999 births
Living people
Doncaster Knights players
English rugby union players
Leicester Tigers players
Rugby union flankers
Rugby union players from Norwich